Indian Summer is the fifth solo album and North American debut by Friedemann, released in 1987.

Track listing

Musicians
Friedemann: Bass, Electric Bass, Composer, Guitar, Acoustic Guitar, Electric Guitar, Harp, Keyboards, Percussion, Vocals, Voices
Johannes Wohlleben: Dulcimer, Hammer Dulcimer, Keyboards, Piano
Philippe Geiss: Soprano Saxophone, Shaker
Detlef Engelhard: Trumpets
Büdi Siebert: Alto Saxophone, Chinese Flute, Zamponas, Tambourine
Emmanuel Séjourné: Vibraphone, Marimba, Castanets
Simon Pomaret: Darbouka, Handclaps
Anne Haigis: Voices
John Seydewitz: Percussion
David Arkenstone: Emulator II

Production
Friedemann: Producer
Johannes Wohlleben: Producer, Engineer
Eric Lindert: Executive Producer, Design
Dave Vartanian: Additional Engineering
R. Hamilton Smith: Cover insert photo
Shinzo Maeda: Cover background photo
Pohlman Studios: Artist photo
James Wagner: Design
Jerry Munley: Design
John Morey: Design

All track information and credits were taken from the LP liner notes.

References

1987 albums
Friedemann Witecka albums
Narada Productions albums